Little Cockup is a fell in the Northern Fells area of the Lake District, Cumbria, England.

Information 
Little Cockup is located near the Great Cockup fell and was given its name of Little Cockup to distinguish it from Great Cockup. The name "Cockup" derives from the words in the Old English language for a secluded valley and Black Grouse.

Little Cockup is often used by fellwalkers and hikers as part of one of several routes to ascend Great Cockup. There is no path up Little Cockup, and walkers have to go through patches of bracken on the way up. There is a circular stone ledge near the top of the fell and on the summit is a cairn with common heather growing around it. Great Cockup and Bassenthwaite Lake can be seen from its summit.

In popular culture 
Little Cockup has been referred to in an edition of Punch magazine and was also mentioned in Alfred Wainwright's walking guidebooks about the Lake District alongside Great Cockup. In 2011, Business Weekly published a news story suggesting that the Government of the United Kingdom's Department for Business, Innovation and Skills' Technology Strategy Board was considering investing in nearby towns and the area around Little Cockup.

Because the name of Little Cockup is a double entendre, it is often included on lists of rude-sounding place names.

References 

Fells of the Lake District